The Make It All Show is the fifth studio album by Skating Polly. It was released on March 4, 2018. It is the first album with drummer Kurtis Mayo. Brad Wood produced the album.

Composition
The lyrics to "Queen for a Day", the album's first single, were co-written by Exene Cervenka , who produced the band's second album, Lost Wonderfuls, which was released in 2013.

Track listing
All songs written by Peyton Bighorse, Kelli Mayo, and Kurtis Mayo; except where noted.

 The Make It All Show

Personnel
Skating Polly
 Kelli Mayo – lead vocals (all tracks except 3, 6, 11), bass (all tracks except 7, 10, 11), guitar (7, 10), piano (11), backing vocals
 Peyton Bighorse – guitar (all tracks except 7, 10), lead vocals (3, 6, 11), co-lead vocals (1), bass (7, 10), drums (5), backing vocals
 Kurtis Mayo – drums (all tracks except 5, 11, "Mostly Glad"), guitar (5)

Additional musicians
 Brad Wood – production, percussion
 Exene Cervenka – backing vocals (4)
 Chick Wolverton – additional guitar (7), backing vocals (8)

Other personnel
 Hans DeKline – mastering

References

2018 albums
Albums produced by Brad Wood
Indie pop albums by American artists
Punk rock albums by American artists
Riot grrrl albums